The 1997 Marlboro Masters of Formula 3 was the seventh Masters of Formula 3 race held at Circuit Park Zandvoort on 3 August 1997. It was won by Tom Coronel, for TOM'S after he started from fourth place.

Drivers and teams

Format changes
With an entry of 51 cars, race organisers changed the format of qualifying to allow every driver a shot at qualifying for the Marlboro Masters itself. The top 28 drivers from qualifying were automatically entered into the race, with the remaining drivers going into a qualifying race, as seen at the Macau Grand Prix. In the qualifying race, the top four finishers would progress to the Marlboro Masters.

Classification

Qualifying

Qualification Race
 The top four drivers progressed to the main race. As Servià won the race, he would line up 29th on the grid, and so forth.

Race

References

Masters of Formula Three
Masters of Formula Three
Masters of Formula Three
Masters of Formula Three